This is a list of museums in Qatar.

Museums in Qatar 
Mathaf: Arab Museum of Modern Art
Museum of Islamic Art, Doha
National Museum of Qatar
Sheikh Faisal Bin Qassim Al Thani Museum
Weaponry Museum

Proposed museums

 Qatar Olympic and Sports Museum

See also 
 Qatar Museums Authority
 List of museums

References

External links
Official website

Museums
 
Museums
Qatar
Qatar